Ozanköy, Nallıhan is a village in the District of Nallıhan, Ankara Province, Turkey. 

According to the Ottoman State Archives; Ozanköy is first acknowledged to exist in 1487 registered under the name "Ozan". Though it likely existed before this date.

References

Villages in Nallıhan District